Semnan County is in Semnan province, Iran. The capital of the county is the city of Semnan. At the 2006 census, the county's population was 186,159 in 52,869 households. The following census in 2011 counted 182,260 people in 53,107 households, by which time Mehdishahr District had been separated from the county to form Mehdishahr County. At the 2016 census, the county's population was 196,521 in 52,011 households, by which time Sorkheh District had been separated from the county to form Sorkheh County.

Administrative divisions

The population history and structural changes of Semnan County's administrative divisions over three consecutive censuses are shown in the following table. The latest census shows one district, one rural district, and one city.

External links
 SemnanLine NEWSPORTAL

References

 

Counties of Semnan Province